Westendorf is a municipality in the Kitzbühel district in the Austrian state of Tyrol located 13.7 km west of Kitzbühel and 12 km southeast of Wörgl in the Brixental valley. The community is a popular ski resort as well as a popular location for Summer tourism especially for excursions and walking-tours. Westendorf was mentioned for the first time in documents in 1234. It has 21 village parts.

Geography
Westendorf lies on a sunny terrace of the Brixental valley, at the foot of the Choralpe. The parish consists of a clustered village (Haufendorf) and other hamlets and farmsteads in the surrounding area, as well as an industrial estate. To the south the Windautal, a popular recreation area, branches off.

A large part of the parish is wooded or used for agricultural purposes.

Rivers:
The Brixentaler Ache and the Windauer Ache flow through the parish.

Mountains:
Important mountains are the Hohe Salve (1,828m), the Steinbergstein (2,215m), the Kröndlhorn (2,444m) and the Brechhorn (2,032m).

Population

See also
Manharter

References

External links

 
 Official tourism website

Cities and towns in Kitzbühel District